Marngoneet Correctional Centre is a 559-bed medium security Australian prison in Lara, Victoria, Australia, located adjacent to maximum security HM Prison Barwon. Marngoneet Correctional Centre officially opened on 3 March 2006.

The Marngoneet Correctional Centre is designed to reduce offenders chance of re-offending offering a number of rehabilitation programs including:
Sex Offender Treatment Programs;
Violent Offender Treatment Programs;
Drug and Alcohol Treatment Programs.

The Marngoneet Correctional Centre also offers vocational services that increase the chance of prisoners employment upon release including:
TAFE accredited training;
A Good Lives Reintegration Service that coordinates a range of programs, including those that relate to release preparation, personal development and recreation programs;
Education service targeting employment preparation and general and adult basic education.

See also
HM Prison Geelong
Pirra Homestead

References 

Government buildings completed in 2006
Prisons in Geelong